Sun Records is an American drama television miniseries based on the musical Million Dollar Quartet written by Colin Escott and Floyd Mutrux. The series takes place at the Sun Studio in Memphis and stars Drake Milligan, Trevor Donovan, Kevin Fonteyne, Christian Lees, Dustin Ingram, Billy Gardell, Jonah Lees, Chad Michael Murray and Jennifer Holland. The series premiered on CMT on February 23, 2017, and concluded on April 13, 2017.

Cast

 Leo Goff as Froggy

Episodes

Reception

Critical response
Sun Records has received mixed to positive reviews from television critics. On Rotten Tomatoes the season has a rating of 60%, based on 10 reviews. On Metacritic, the season has a score of 65 out of 100, based on 8 critics, indicating "generally favorable reviews".

Ratings

References

External links
 

2010s American television miniseries
2017 American television series debuts
2017 American television series endings
2010s American drama television series
English-language television shows
Serial drama television series
CMT (American TV channel) original programming
Television shows set in Tennessee